City Place is a mixed-use facility featuring two 20-story buildings in central Fort Worth, Texas. The complex was formerly known as Tandy Center and served as the corporate headquarters for RadioShack (formerly Tandy Corporation) for many years, designed by Growald Architects of Fort Worth, Texas and built by Beck. During the Tandy/RadioShack years, the complex included a mall and an ice skating rink.

Leonard's Department Store opened on the site on February 12, 1963. In 1967, the Tandy Corporation bought the chain of department stores.  As the corporation grew, it needed a new headquarters and so it demolished the department store in 1974 and constructed its headquarters on the site. The new Tandy Center included two office towers as well as a mall with an indoor ice skating rink. The mall was anchored by Dillard's. In the 1990s the mall began to decline and the anchor tenant moved out in 1995. It was turned into an outlet store shopping center with hopes of it revitalizing Downtown Fort Worth, but these efforts have failed and the mall was shuttered in the 2000s. It has since been demolished.

Originally built by the department store Leonard's as Leonard's M&O Subway, the Tandy Center Subway operated between the center and fringe parking lots from 1963 to 2002. When Leonard's was demolished the subway station was preserved and integrated into the new Tandy Center complex.

In 2000, a tornado hit Fort Worth, causing damage to several downtown buildings including the Tandy Center.

In 2001, the RadioShack Corporation sold the Tandy Center to another company, and made plans to construct a new corporate headquarters a few blocks away on the Trinity River. The new owner renamed the complex City Place. The former shopping mall was demolished in 2011, making way for a new garage with retail on the ground floor. As of 2021, City Place includes two multi-story buildings on opposite sides of Throckmorton Street, connected by a pedestrian skyway. The structures are made up principally of office and parking space.

References

 City Place from FortWorthArchitecture.com

Skyscraper office buildings in Fort Worth, Texas
Skyscraper office buildings in Texas
Headquarters in the United States
RadioShack